Mishrilal Yadav is an Indian politician from Bihar and a member of the Bihar Legislative Assembly. Yadav won the Alinagar Assembly constituency on the VIP ticket in the 2020 Bihar Legislative Assembly election.

References

Living people
Bihar MLAs 2020–2025
Vikassheel Insaan Party politicians
People from Darbhanga district
1957 births
Bharatiya Janata Party politicians from Bihar